The hamlet of Mumford lies on the western side of the Town of Wheatland, Monroe County, New York, United States, south of Oatka Creek on NY 36 and south of the terminus of NY 383.

History

The story of Mumford has been written by several local historians. Carl F Schmidt, an architect locally noted for his histories of the area, and George Engs Slocum, a local writer whose history of Wheatland appeared in the very early twentieth century. In 1998 (Slocum) and 2002 (Schmidt), the Wheatland Historical Association commissioned reprints of their books.

The First Baptist Church of Mumford and First Presbyterian Church of Mumford are listed on the National Register of Historic Places.

Founding

Mumford traces its origin directly back to a group of Scottish emigrants who, tiring of English tyranny, left Perthshire for the New World, sailing from Greenock early in March 1798. Following their arrival in New York on May Day, they traveled to Johnstown, in Montgomery County. Johnstown was already home to a number of Scots who had left Scotland in previous years.

A land agent named Charles Williamson, a former Scot working for an English absentee landowner, induced them to settle in the Caledonia area, then known as Big Springs. His terms appealed to the immigrant Scots, who deputed five of their number to examine the land. Delighted with what they found, countryside not at all unlike their native Scotland, with its southern Highlands and excellent agricultural straths, they sealed the deal. The first group of Scotsmen left Johnstown in March 1799, traveling by sleigh. In the autumn, the remainder followed.

The Big Springs area was home to the Turtle clan of the Seneca Nation. The first settlers in Big Springs, two Englishmen named Kane and Moffatt, arrived in 1795 and promptly built a tavern. Peterson and Fuller soon acquired the tavern, but, when the Scots arrived, the land was still wilderness. Schmidt described the first of the public works projects which eventually tamed this wilderness:

At this point, Scottsville was home to a mere dozen settlers. Francis Albright, the builder of the area's first industrial establishment, Albright's Mill at what would become known as Wheatland Center, arrived in 1799. On Canawaugus Road, Dugan and Schoonover had settled on or near Dugan's Creek. The Scot settlers had no plan to found a village; they were there for the farming. Their farms covered the expanse of land from several miles south of Caledonia, to the east as far as Wheatland Center, and out west along Creek Road. Again, in Schmidt's words:

A group of some thirty Scotsmen comprised the second influx of settlers, in 1803. That year also saw the first schoolhouse west of the Genesee River, built on a knoll south of Oatka Creek and five hundred fifty yards west of the bridge over the creek. John McLaren says of the first teacher, one Alexander McDonald, that he was "the most harsh and tyrannical man ever to wield the birch. By his sanctimonious talk and appearance, he produced the impression upon the minds of the parents that he was imbued with unusual holiness." When the parents realized McDonald's true nature, they invited him to find employment elsewhere, an invitation that did not go unheeded: he went to Canada.

Over the next some years, more people came to the area. They built not only farms but mills for sawing lumber, fulling, dyeing, carding, wool-making, and grinding flour, as well as the manufacture of clothing.

Today
The US Census Bureau does not maintain demographic data for Mumford.

Notable buildings in Mumford today include the Post office, Library, and local Firehall.

Culture and recreation
The Genesee Country Village & Museum contains a model historic village preserving local architecture, a nature center, model gardens, and sporting art and carriage museums.

References

External links
https://web.archive.org/web/20080929130254/http://www.rootsweb.ancestry.com/~nymonroe/vr/wheatland1869.htm - business directory from 1869

Hamlets in New York (state)
Hamlets in Monroe County, New York